Ceratolasma is a genus of harvestmen in the family Ischyropsalididae, found in the Pacific Northwest. There is one described species in Ceratolasma, C. tricantha.

Ceratolasma was formerly a member of the family Ceratolasmatidae, but was moved to Ischyropsalididae, along with Ceratolasmatidae which became the subfamily Ceratolasmatinae.

References

Further reading

 

Harvestmen